The Cryptomycetaceae are a family of fungi in the Rhytismatales order.

References

Leotiomycetes